The Mahajamba is a river of northern Madagascar. It flows through Ankarafantsika National Park. The river is surrounded in mangroves.

References

Rivers of Madagascar